CD Country was a 24-hour music format produced by Jones Radio Networks. Its playlist is composed of mostly modern country music from artists such as Tim McGraw, Gretchen Wilson, Keith Urban, Brooks & Dunn, and Rascal Flatts.  Unlike other country stations and networks, CD Country draws the most active segment of the Country audience away from mainstream by utilizing digital technology.

Jones was recently purchased by Triton Media Group and this network was integrated into Dial Global's "Hot Country" satellite feed on December 29, 2008.

See also
U.S. Country

Competitor Networks
Today's Best Country by ABC Radio Networks

External links  
CD Country - Official Website

Radio formats
Defunct radio networks in the United States
Defunct radio stations in the United States